Australutica is a genus of spiders in the family Zodariidae. It was first described in 1995 by Jocqué. , it contains 6 species.

Species
Australutica comprises the following species:
 A. africana Jocqué, 2008 — South Africa
 A. manifesta Jocqué, 1995 — Australia (South Australia)
 A. moreton Jocqué, 1995 (type) — Australia (Queensland)
 A. normanlarseni Jocqué, 2008 — South Africa
 A. quaerens Jocqué, 1995 — Australia (South Australia)
 A. xystarches Jocqué, 1995 — Australia (South Australia)

References

Zodariidae
Araneomorphae genera
Spiders of Africa
Spiders of Australia